Geoff or Jeff Holt may refer to:

Geoff Holt (artist) (1942–1998), British artist
Geoff Holt (sailor) (born 1966), English sailor
Jeff Holt (mushing), a participant in the 2007 Iditarod